The Embrandiri (Malayalam: എമ്പ്രാന്തിരി), also transliterated as Embranthiri, are a Malayali Brahmin subcaste of Tulu origin.

Some sects of Embranthiris have adopted the Malayali Brahmin surnames "Namboothiri" and "Potti" after arriving in Kerala. There are followers of Vaishnavism as well as Shaivism among Embranthiris and some Embranthiris because of their Vaishnava Dharmaserve in Vishnu temples and Krishna temples. Some of them are also practitionars of and other Vedic Srauta rituals.

History
In the 8th century AD, as per the request from King Udayavarma Raja of Kolathunaad (a small ancient kingdom in north Kerala), King Mayooravarman of Gokarnam sent 237 Tulu Brahmanan families to Kolathunaad. These family members performed "Hiranyagarbha" and converted themselves into Malayala Brahmanans. They had settled in Arathil, Cheruthaazham, Pilathara and Chirakkal. All these places are in and around one of the strongest Namboothiri Graamams (villages) of those days, Perinchelloor (near today's Taliparamba in Kannur district in north Kerala). These Brahmanas are both Shaivite and Vaishnavite in orientation and place emphasis on performing Yajnas like the Namboodiris and speak Malayalam exclusively.  

Later, 257 Tulu Brahmanan families also migrated to these areas. In Kerala, the former 237 families are known as "Saagara" Brahmanans and the latter 257 families, "Samudra" Brahmanans. Both are generally known by the name Embranthiris. All are Sivollis and Yajurvedis (Boudhaayanan), and some of them are  followers of Madhvacharya. Most of the Brahmins in speak Malayalam and also aligned their practices with those of the Namboothiris. These Samudra Brahmins were however seen as distinct from the Saagara Brahmins by the Namboodiris and had to live and dine separately
 
Later, more Tulu Brahmanans migrated to Kerala but they neither converted themselves to Namboothiris nor removed Tulu culture from their daily life. They still speak Tulu at home. Some of them, later migrated back to their motherland.

Present day 
Due to shortage of Temple priests in Travancore (Thiruvithankoor, south Kerala) their king brought 143 of the initial (237 + 257) Embranthiri families to Thiruvalla (a place still existing near Kottayam in south Kerala).  Most of the families moved to South Kerala because of culture and tradition of Kerala Brahmins (Namboothiri) is very much close enough to their culture. They moved to several places of Kerala and founded Madams as their home. Later they used Madam as their family name.

Philosophy 
Most early Malayalam speaking Embrandiris are followers of only the Smarta-Srauta Karmas prescribed to a Brahmin and do not align with any school of thought. Some like the Namboothiris can be classified as following Theistic Mimamsa. Later Brahmins who migrated from Tulunadu into Kerala have large segments of the followers of Dvaita Vedanta of Madhvacharya among them and are ardent devotees of Lord Vishnu.

References

Brahmin communities of Kerala
Culture of Kerala